William Norman may refer to:
 William Norman (VC), English recipient of the Victoria Cross
 William Norman (cricketer), New Zealand cricketer
 William Henry Norman, sea captain in Australia
 Shin Norman (William Rufus Norman), Negro leagues pitcher
 Bill Norman (football manager) (William Lewis Norman), English football manager
 Bill Norman (footballer) (William John Norman), Australian rules footballer